The U.S. state of Kansas is bordered by Nebraska to the north; Missouri to the east; Oklahoma to the south; and Colorado to the west. The state is divided into 105 counties with 628 cities, with its largest county by area being Butler County. Kansas is located equidistant from the Pacific and Atlantic oceans. The geographic center of the 48 contiguous states is in Smith County near Lebanon. Until 1989, the Meades Ranch Triangulation Station in Osborne County was the geodetic center of North America: the central reference point for all maps of North America. The geographic center of Kansas is in Barton County.

Geology and Topography

Kansas is underlain by a sequence of horizontal to gently westward dipping sedimentary rocks. A sequence of Mississippian, Pennsylvanian and Permian rocks outcrop in the eastern and southern part of the state. The state's western half has exposures of Cretaceous through Tertiary sediments, the latter derived from the erosion of the uplifted Rocky Mountains to the west. These are underlain by older Paleozoic and Mesozoic sediments which correlate well with the outcrops to the east. The state's northeastern corner was subjected to glaciation in the Pleistocene and is covered by glacial drift and loess. 

Kansas has been divided into eleven different physiographic regions.

The western two-thirds of the state, lying in the great central plain of the United States, has a generally flat or undulating surface, while the eastern third has many hills and forests. It is a common misconception that Kansas is the flattest state in the nation—in 2003, a tongue-in-cheek study famously declared the state "flatter than a pancake".

Features

Rivers

Nearly  of the state's northeastern boundary is defined by the Missouri River.

With its tributaries, (the Little Arkansas, Ninnescah, Walnut, Cow Creek, Cimarron, Verdigris, and the Neosho), it forms the southern drainage system of the state.

Kansas's other rivers are the Saline and Solomon Rivers, tributaries of the Smoky Hill River; the Big Blue, Delaware, and Wakarusa, which flow into the Kansas River; and the Marais des Cygnes, a tributary of the Missouri River. Spring River is located between Riverton and Baxter Springs.

National parks and historic sites

Areas under the protection of the National Park Service include:
 Brown v. Board of Education National Historic Site in Topeka
 California National Historic Trail
 Fort Larned National Historic Site in Larned
 Fort Scott National Historic Site
 Lewis and Clark National Historic Trail
 Nicodemus National Historic Site at Nicodemus
 Oregon National Historic Trail
 Pony Express National Historic Trail
 Santa Fe National Historic Trail
 Tallgrass Prairie National Preserve near Strong City

Flora and fauna
In Kansas, there are currently 238 species of rare animals and 400 rare plants. Among those include: Boechera laevigata, Virginia Rail, Cleft Ledge, Royal Fern, Turkey-tangle, Bobolink, Cave Salamander, Peregrine Falcon, and Black-footed ferret. Common animal species and grasses include: Crows, Deer, Lesser Prairie Chicken, Mice, Moles, Opossum, Prairie Dogs, Raccoon, Tripsacum dactyloides, Prairie Dropseed, Indian Grass, Little Bluestem, Switch Grass, Northern Sea Oats, Tussock Sedge, Sideoats Grama, and Big Bluestem.

Climate

According to the Köppen climate classification, Kansas's climate can be characterized in terms of three types: it has humid continental, semi-arid steppe, and humid subtropical. The eastern two-thirds of the state (especially the northeastern portion) has a humid continental climate, with cool to cold winters and hot, often humid summers. Most of the precipitation falls during both the summer and the spring.

The western third of the state—from roughly the U.S. Route 83 corridor westward—has a semi-arid steppe climate. Summers are hot, often very hot, and generally less humid. Winters are highly changeable between warm and very cold. Chinook winds in the winter can warm western Kansas all the way into the  range.

The south-central and southeastern portions of the state, including the Wichita area, have a humid subtropical climate with hot and humid summers, milder winters, and more precipitation than elsewhere in Kansas. Some features of all three climates can be found in most of the state, with droughts and changeable weather between dry and humid not uncommon, and both warm and cold spells in the winter.

Temperatures in areas between U.S. Routes 83 and 81, as well as the southwestern portion of the state along and south of U.S. 50, reach  or above on most days of June, July, and August. High humidity added to the high temperatures sends the heat index into life-threatening territory, especially in Wichita, Hutchinson, Salina, Russell, Hays, and Great Bend. Temperatures are often higher in Dodge City, Garden City, and Liberal, but the heat index in those three cities is usually lower than the actual air temperature.

Also, combined with humidity between 85 and 95 percent, dangerous heat indices can be experienced at every hour of the day.

Frost-free days range from more than 200 days in the south, to 130 days in the northwest. Thus, Kansas is the country's ninth or tenth sunniest state, depending on the source. Western Kansas is as sunny as parts of California and Arizona.

Kansas is prone to severe weather, especially in the spring and the early-summer. Despite the frequent sunshine throughout much of the state, due to its location at a climatic boundary prone to intrusions of multiple air masses, the state is vulnerable to strong and severe thunderstorms. Some of these storms become supercell thunderstorms; these can produce some tornadoes, occasionally those of EF3 strength or higher. Kansas averages more than 50 tornadoes annually. Severe thunderstorms sometimes drop some very large hail over Kansas as well. Furthermore, these storms can even bring in flash flooding and damaging straight line winds.

Kansas's record high of  ties with North Dakota for the fifth-highest record high in an American state, behind California, Arizona, Nevada, and New Mexico.

Climate data

See also
 Geography of Nebraska
 Tallgrass prairie
 Tornado Alley
 Geography of Oklahoma
 Geography of Colorado

References

Geography of Kansas